Poplar River Township is a township in Red Lake County, Minnesota, United States. The population was 125 at the 2000 census.

This township took its name from the Poplar River.

Geography
According to the United States Census Bureau, the township has a total area of 34.9 square miles (90.5 km), all land.

Demographics

Age 
According to a 2021 census the Median age is 64.8. 5.8% was 0-9 years old. 13% was 10-19. 1.5% was 20-29. 4.4% was 30-39. 10.1% was 40-49. 8.7% was 50-59. 27.5% was 60-69. 21.7% was 70-79. 7.3% was 80+.

Sex an Ethnicity 
61% of the population was male and 39 was female. 99% was White and 1% was Hispanic.

Income 
69.9% made under $50k. 17.1% made $50k-$100k. 20% made $100k-$200k.

References

Townships in Red Lake County, Minnesota
Townships in Minnesota